The 2003 Tennessee Volunteers football team represented the University of Tennessee in the 2003 NCAA Division I-A football season. The team was coached by Phillip Fulmer.  The Vols played their home games in Neyland Stadium and competed in the Eastern Division of the Southeastern Conference (SEC). The Vols finished the season 10–3, 6–2 in SEC play and lost the Peach Bowl, 27–14, to Clemson.

Schedule

Personnel

Roster

Coaching staff
 Phillip Fulmer – head coach
 John Chavis – defensive coordinator
 Randy Sanders – offensive coordinator

Team players drafted into the NFL

References

Tennessee
Tennessee Volunteers football seasons
Tennessee Volunteers football